Ahi Mahalleh (also Romanized as Āhī Maḩalleh) is a village in Harazpey-ye Gharbi Rural District, in the Central District of Mahmudabad County, Mazandaran Province, Iran. At the 2006 census, its population was 1,281, in 336 families.

References 

Populated places in Mahmudabad County